Juan Guilbe Colón (June 26, 1914 – April 29, 1994) was a Puerto Rican professional baseball pitcher in the American Negro leagues in the 1940s.

A native of Ponce, Puerto Rico, Guilbe was the brother of fellow Negro leaguer Felix Guilbe. Older brother Juan pitched in the Negro leagues for the New York Cubans in 1940, and the Indianapolis Clowns in 1947, and was inducted into the Puerto Rican Baseball Hall of Fame in 1992. Guilbe died in Ponce in 1994 at age 79.

References

External links
 and Seamheads

1914 births
1994 deaths
Indianapolis Clowns players
New York Cubans players
20th-century African-American sportspeople
Baseball pitchers